The Northern Territories Federation of Labour (NTFL), affiliated to the Canadian Labour Congress, represents workers in the Northwest Territories and Nunavut. The federation was founded in 1980 and represents 9,000 workers in 17 affiliated trade unions.

Affiliates 
Canadian Employment & Immigration Union
Canadian Union of Postal Workers (CUPW)
Canadian Union of Public Employees (CUPE)
Government Services Union
International Association of Machinists and Aerospace Workers
International Brotherhood of Electrical Workers

 Natural Resources Union
Public Service Alliance of Canada – Union of Northern Workers (UNW)
Nunavut Employees Union (NEU)
Seafarers International of Canada
Teamsters
UNIFOR
United Steelworkers
Union of Canadian Transportation Employees
Union of Environment Workers
Union of National Defense Employees
Union of Solicitor General Employees

References 

Canadian Labour Congress
Provincial federations of labour (Canada)
Trade unions established in 1980
Yellowknife